Qalat, Qelat, Kalat, Kalaat, Kalut, or Kelat, may refer to:

 Qalat (fortress), a fortified place or fortified village

Afghanistan
 Qalat, Zabul, a city and provincial capital
 Kalat, Badakhshan, a small village

Algeria
 Qalat Ibn Salama, a fortress near Tihert (present-day Tiaret)

Bahrain
 Qal'at al-Bahrain, an archaeological site

Burma
Kalat, Banmauk, Burma

Iran
 Kalat, Kangan, Bushehr Province
 Kalat, Tangestan, Bushehr Province
 Kalat, Chaharmahal and Bakhtiari
 Kalat, East Azerbaijan
 Qalat, Bavanat, Fars Province
 Qalat, Jahrom, Fars Province
 Qalat, Larestan, Fars Province
 Qalat, Qir and Karzin, Fars Province
 Qalat, Shiraz, Fars Province
 Kalat, Hormozgan
 Kalut, Iran, Hormozgan Province
 Qalat-e Bala, Hormozgan Province
 Kalat-e Mahmak, Hormozgan Province
 Qalat-e Pain, Hormozgan Province
 Qalat-e Rostam, Hormozgan Province
 Kelat, Ilam
 Qalat, Bahmai, Kohgiluyeh and Boyer-Ahmad Province
 Qalat, Charam, Kohgiluyeh and Boyer-Ahmad Province
 Kalat, Charusa, Kohgiluyeh and Boyer-Ahmad Province
 Kalat, Kohgiluyeh, Kohgiluyeh and Boyer-Ahmad Province
 Kalat, Lorestan
 Kalat, North Khorasan
 Qalat, Qazvin
 Kalat, Gonabad, Razavi Khorasan Province
 Kalat, Razavi Khorasan, in Razavi Khorasan Province
 Kalat, Semnan
 Kalat, Sistan and Baluchestan
 Qalat, Mahabad, West Azerbaijan Province
 Qalat, Naqadeh, West Azerbaijan Province
 Qalat, Piranshahr, West Azerbaijan Province
 Qalat, Zanjan
 Kalat-e Naderi, a natural fortress located north of Sousia in the Kalat, Khorasan region 
 Kalat County, a county in Razavi Khorasan Province, Iran

Iraq
 Qalat or Erbil Citadel
 Qelat (Ranya), a subdivision of Ranya, Iraq
 Qalat Sukkar, Dhi Qar Governorate

Pakistan
 Kalat, Pakistan
 Kalat District, a district in Balochistan, Pakistan
 Kalat Division, a former administrative division of the Balochistan Province
 Khanate of Kalat, former princely state in Balochistan, Pakistan

Saudi Arabia
 Qalat Bishah

Tunisia
 Kalaat es Senam

See also
 Kala (disambiguation), the Persian alternate spelling of Arabic qal'a
 Qala (disambiguation) or qal'a, the Arabic word for fortress or castle
 Qalat (fortress)
 Qila (disambiguation), the Persian (Urdu, Hindi) variant of Arabic qal'a